The Coldest Winter: America and the Korean War is a non-fiction book by the author David Halberstam. It was published posthumously in 2007, after his sudden death in a traffic collision at the age of 73.

Subject
The book, written more than half a century after the Korean War, looks at the war from a different perspective than previously written works on the war by various authors.

Quotes pay homage to an earlier Korean War author T. R. Fehrenbach, and The Coldest Winter mentions Fehrenbach's combat experience, something that Fehrenbach never mentions for himself in his seminal work, This Kind of War.

References

External links
Panel discussion at the Library of Congress on The Coldest War with U.S. Army veterans of the Korean War, September 29, 2007
TimesTalks panel discussion on The Coldest War with Dexter Filkins, Frances FitzGerald, Leslie H. Gelb, Joseph C. Goulden, Don Oberdorfer, William W. Stueck, and Bernard E. Trainor, September 25, 2007

2007 non-fiction books
Books by David Halberstam
Korean War books
The Coldest Winter
American non-fiction books
Hyperion Books books